The FM H-10-44 was a yard switcher produced by Fairbanks-Morse from August, 1944–March, 1950.

The Raymond Loewy-designed carbody featured a slanted nose, sloping hood lines, and (considered to be its most distinguishing feature) a protruding roof visor mounted on the rear of the cab. These styling cues were carried through to the H-10-44's successor, the FM H-12-44, until September 1952 when the exterior design was "Spartanized" to reduce production costs.

A total of 195 units were built for American railroads.  Three intact examples of the H-10-44 are known to survive today, all of which are owned by railroad museums. Most notable of these is Milwaukee Road #760 (originally delivered as #1802), the first Fairbanks–Morse locomotive constructed in their own plant, which is preserved and operational at the Illinois Railway Museum.  

Another example is former Hallet Dock Company HD-11, which is now at the Lake Superior Railroad Museum in Duluth, Minnesota. 

A reproduction H-10-44 locomotive sits atop the Wood Family Fishing Bridge, a former railroad bridge which crosses the Rock River several hundred yards south of the foundry where the H-10-44s were built, in Beloit, Wisconsin.

Units produced

References

External links
 Fairbanks-Morse H10-44 Roster
 Preserved Fairbanks Morse Yard Power

B-B locomotives
H-10-44
Diesel-electric locomotives of the United States
Railway locomotives introduced in 1944
Standard gauge locomotives of the United States